Pentageia ( or) is a village in Cyprus, west of Morphou and  east of Karavostasi. De facto, it is under the control of Northern Cyprus.

References

Communities in Nicosia District
Populated places in Lefke District
Greek Cypriot villages depopulated during the 1974 Turkish invasion of Cyprus